The Astravahini class of torpedo recovery vessels are a series of naval auxiliary watercraft built by Goa Shipyard Limited and P.S. & Company for the Indian Navy. They are intended to recover practice torpedoes and mines, fired and laid by ships, submarines and aircraft. The vessels can stow two full-sized torpedoes on deck and two on a recovery ramp. 

The vessel A72 sank on 6 November 2014 during a routine exercise near Visakhapatnam after taking on water, with one sailor dead and four missing.

Ships in the class

Specification (A71 & A72)
Displacement: 110 tonnes
Speed: 11 knots
Dimension: 28.5 X 6.1 X 1.4 meters
Engine: 2 Kirloskar MAN 12 cyl. diesels, 2 props. 720 bhp
Crew: 13 total

See also
List of active Indian Navy ships
, a catamaran-hulled torpedo recovery vessel that replaced the Astravahini class

References

External links

A-71 Decommissioned

Training ships of the Indian Navy
Auxiliary training ship classes